Alan Eglin Heathcote Emery  (born 1928) is a British medical geneticist, known for his study of muscular dystrophy.

Emery began his working life in the King's Hussars, and graduated in biological sciences from University of Manchester. In 1960 he obtained his medical degree there.

His PhD in human genetics was earned at Johns Hopkins University.

In 1968 he became a foundation professor of human genetics at the University of Edinburgh.

Having established the European Neuromuscular Centre, he was its chief scientific advisor from 1999.

He was the first president of the Royal Society of Medicine’s Section of Medical Genetics, which he established, from 2001 to 2004.

He was a research fellow and subsequently an honorary fellow of Green Templeton College from 1985.

He was elected a Fellow of the Royal College of Physicians (FRCP), Fellow of the Royal College of Physicians of Edinburgh (FRCPE), a Fellow of the American College of Medical Genetics (FACMG), a Fellow of the Linnean Society (FLS), a Fellow of the Royal Society of Arts (FRSA) and a Fellow of the Royal Society of Edinburgh (FRSE).

Both Emery–Dreifuss muscular dystrophy and its defective protein product, emerin, are named after him (the former jointly with Fritz E. Dreifuss)).

References

External links 

 

1928 births
Place of birth missing (living people)
Living people
British geneticists
Fellows of the Royal College of Physicians
Fellows of the Royal College of Physicians of Edinburgh
Fellows of the American College of Medical Genetics
Fellows of the Linnean Society of London
Fellows of the Royal Society of Edinburgh